Roger Griffiths (20 February 1945 – 19 July 2006) was a professional footballer with Hereford United.  Griffiths was the first player to be substituted in Hereford United's then-42 year existence in 1966.  Griffiths was a defender who made 250 appearances for the club. One of his most famous appearances was in the FA Cup match between Hereford United and Newcastle United, in which Griffiths played for 80 minutes with a broken leg.  Later, Griffiths played for Worcester City and Cheltenham Town.

References

Hereford United F.C. players
Worcester City F.C. players
Cheltenham Town F.C. players
1945 births
2006 deaths
Association football fullbacks
English footballers